Philip Kiriakis is a character from Days of Our Lives, an American soap opera on the NBC network. Child actors portrayed the character of Philip until he was rapidly aged and returned under the portrayal of Brandon Tyler in October 1999. Tyler was quickly replaced by Jay Kenneth Johnson, who was in the role until leaving the show in December 2002. The character returned in May 2003 played by Kyle Brandt. After Brandt left the show in October 2006, Johnson returned to the role in January 2007 then left on April 20, 2011. In 2015, actor John-Paul Lavoisier was cast in the role; he was let go the following year, last appearing in December 2016. In 2019, Johnson reprised the role on the digital-only Last Blast Reunion series and returned to Days of Our Lives in August 2020.

Casting

Child actors Jonathan and Thomas Selstad and Shane Nicholas played Philip from the character's birth until the rapidly aged character returned in the form of Brandon Tyler from October 21, 1999, to December 24, 1999. He was then portrayed by Jay Kenneth Johnson from December 27, 1999, to December 25, 2002 and Kyle Brandt from May 14, 2003, to October 12, 2006. Johnson again portrayed Philip having returned to the role from January 12, 2007, to April 20, 2011.

In July 2015, it was announced former One Life to Live actor John-Paul Lavoisier has been cast as Philip, first appearing on December 10 of the same year, as part of the soap's fiftieth anniversary. In July 2016, it was announced that Lavoisier would vacate the role of Philip and would film his final scenes within the month. The actor's final appearance was slated for December 19, 2016. However, the date was pushed back to December 20, 2016. In November 2019, People announced that Johnson would reprise the role in the digital "Last Blast Reunion" series. In May 2020, it was revealed that Johnson would again reprise the role on Days of Our Lives; he returned during the August 18, 2020, episode. Johnson vacated the role on December 22, 2021.

Storylines
Philip is the biological son of Victor Kiriakis (John Aniston) and his fiancee Kate Roberts and the surrogate son of Vivian Alamain (Louise Sorel). He attends Salem High School before joining the military and marrying Belle Black. Later, he loses part of his left leg and has to wear a prosthetic. Philip and Belle separate when it is discovered that Claire Brady is not his biological daughter, but they eventually reunite and try to conceive their own child through in vitro fertilization. Philip's sperm is switched with Shawn-Douglas Brady's, resulting in Philip having a son Tyler with Mimi Lockhart. Belle leaves Philip for Shawn and Tyler is later placed for adoption. Phillip begins dating Stephanie Johnson and takes a more active role in running Titan Industries with his father. Phillip is seen as a disappointment by Victor and so he goes into business with Tony DiMera but, when they have an argument on the pier, Tony falls onto a sharp plank and dies at the hospital. Tony is not dead and reappears in 2020.  Nicole Walker witnesses the scene and after being pressured by both Bo Brady and her father-in-law Stefano DiMera finally says it was an accident and Phillip is cleared of any wrongdoing. Victor becomes protective of Phillip once Stefano is consumed by grief and anger over Tony's death and threatens revenge against Phillip. While on a romantic trip with Stephanie, Phillip is shot and almost dies and everyone immediately suspects that Stefano ordered the hit as revenge for Tony's death.

Phillip has a one-night stand with Chloe Lane while he is married to Melanie Layton. Chloe gives birth to a boy Parker Jonas, whom she names after Daniel Jonas' mother's maiden name, since Daniel is assumed to be the father. Chloe and Phillip later believe (incorrectly) that Phillip is Parker's father, since Caroline switched the paternity test results. Melanie suffers a miscarriage caused by stress. Phillip leaves Salem for Chicago with Parker.  Chloe later reveals that Daniel is actually Parker's biological father.

References

External links 
 Philip Kiriakis profile – SoapCentral.com

Days of Our Lives characters
Fictional amputees
Fictional United States Marine Corps personnel
Television characters introduced in 1995
Fictional businesspeople
Fictional Greek people in television
Male characters in television
Fictional characters incorrectly presumed dead
Roberts family (Days of Our Lives)
Kiriakis family